Myricetin 3-O-rutinoside (or Myricetin 3-rutinoside) is a chemical compound. It can be isolated in Chrysobalanus icaco and in  fruits (blackcurrant: 3.14 mg/100 g, greencurrant: 0.78 mg/100 g).

References 

Flavonol rutinosides